Tethea albicosta is a moth in the family Drepanidae. It is found in Nepal, Assam in India, Myanmar and the Chinese provinces of Hubei, Hunan, Sichuan, Guangdong, Guangxi, Yunnan and Tibet.

Adults are greyish brown, the forewings varied pinkish and greenish white along the costa beneath which are several narrow transverse undulating dark-brown pale-bordered lines. There are two indistinct reniform discal marks, as well as a curved streak beneath the apex and a marginal undulating narrow line. The hindwings have a discal and two subbasal pale bands.

References

Moths described in 1867
Thyatirinae